The 2020–21 season was Pafos's 7th year in existence, and fourth season in the Cypriot First Division.

Season review

July
On 15 July, Pafos signed Rushian Hepburn-Murphy from Aston Villa.

August
On 4 August, Pafos signed Josef Kvída from NEC Nijmegen, with Camilo Saiz joining on a season-long loan deal from Independiente Medellín on 6 August.

On 13 August, Will Mannion joined Pafos after being released by Hull City.

On 24 August, Pafos announced the signing of Mukwelle Akale from Villarreal B. with João Aurélio joining Pafos from Moreirense the following day.

September
On 3 September, Danila Yanov joined Pafos on a season-long loan from Riga.

On 5 September, Orest Kuzyk signed for Pafos from PAS Giannina.

On 9 September, Jack Evans joined Pafos on a season-long loan from Swansea City.

On 13 September, Pafos confirmed the signings of Navarone Foor from Al-Ittihad Kalba, and Marcelo Torres from Boca Juniors after a successful loan stint in the previous season.

On 21 September, Pafos signed Sam Hutchinson on a free transfer from Sheffield Wednesday.

October
On 20 October, Cameron Toshack's contract as Head Coach of Pafos was terminated by mutual consent, with Dmytro Mykhaylenko being appointed as his replacement on the same day.

December
On 21 December, Artur Rudko signed a one-year extension to his Pafos contract, keeping him at the club until the summer of 2022.
On 24 December, Pafos confirmed that Jack Evans' loan deal had been ended. Four days later, 28 December, the club confirmed that Sam Hutchinson had left Pafos by mutual agreement.

On 28 December, Pafos announced the singing of Stefan Panić from Riga.

January
On 4 January, Mickaël Panos moved on loan to Enosis Neon Paralimni until the end of the season.

On 28 January, Pafos announced the signing of Víctor Álvarez.

On 31 January, Dmytro Mykhaylenko left his role as Head Coach.

February
On 4 February, recently appointed Chief of Football Operations Stephen Constantine, became the new Head Coach of Pafos, with Míchel Salgado becoming taking the role previously held by Constantine on 5 February.

On 14 February, Pafos announced that Brayan Angulo had left the club by mutual agreement.

March
On 10 March, Danila Yanov's loan with Pafos was ended early and he returned to Riga.

May
At the end of the season, Pafos announced that they had signed new one-year contracts, with the option of an additional year, with Jason Puncheon and Kévin Bérigaud.

Transfers

In

Loans in

Loans out

Released

Squad

Out on loan

Left club during season

Friendlies

Competitions

Overview

Cyta Championship

Regular season

League table

Results summary

Results by results

Results

Relegation round

League table

Results summary

Results by results

Results

Cypriot Cup

Squad statistics

Appearances and goals

|-
|colspan="14"|Players away on loan:

|-
|colspan="14"|Players who appeared for Pafos but left during the season:

|}

Goal scorers

Clean sheets

Disciplinary record

References

Pafos FC seasons
Pafos FC season